Saint-Pierre-de-la-Rivière-du-Sud is a parish municipality in Quebec.

Demographics 

See also
 List of parish municipalities in Quebec
 Amable Bélanger

References

Parish municipalities in Quebec
Incorporated places in Chaudière-Appalaches
Canada geography articles needing translation from French Wikipedia